S. M. Michael was one of the early 20th-century translators of the Tirukkural into English.

Biography 
S. M. Michael, a native of Nagarcoil, Tamil Nadu, was a pious devotee of the Kural text. He started translating the ancient literature into English in the pre-Independence Era. He established a publishing house named 'The Grace Hut' in the early forties in Nagarcoil. In 1946, he revised his translation and published it for the first time, under the title The Sacred Aphorisms of Thiruvalluvar. It was the fifth of the series published by the publishing house. These works were funded by several patrons, including the Government of Travancore, Dewan C. P. Ramaswami Iyer, and 40 others, whom he acknowledged in the preliminary pages of his translation.

In 1968, the work was published again by his son M. S. Raja in Sattur.

See also

 Tirukkural translations
 Tirukkural translations into English
 List of translators into English

References

Further reading
 Manavalan, A. A. (2010). A Compendium of Tirukkural Translations in English (4 vols.). Chennai: Central Institute of Classical Tamil, .

Tamil–English translators
Translators of the Tirukkural into English
Tirukkural translators